De Watteville's Regiment was a Swiss regiment founded by Frédéric de Watteville and recruited from regiments that served between 1799 and 1801 in the Austrian army but in British pay. The troops then signed on as mercenaries, to be paid by the British. They fought in the Napoleonic Wars (1803–1815), mainly around the Mediterranean, and were based in Malta and then in Egypt from 1801 to 1803, fighting in Sicily and Naples. The regiment fought and won the Battle of Maida, in Italy in July 1806. From 1811 to 1813 the unit served under Wellington in the Peninsular War in Spain, and defending Cadiz in the Siege of Cádiz. In 1812 Louis de Watteville took over as Colonel and propriotor of the regiment from his uncle Frédéric de Watteville.
The regiment sailed to Canada in 1813 to fight in the War of 1812, including the Battle of Fort Oswego (1814) and at the Siege of Fort Erie. The unit was retired at the end of the war and soldiers were given tracts of land in Canada. Some of its soldiers also served at the Red River Colony. Some 150 recently discharged soldiers from the both the recently disbanded De Watteville Regiment and Regiment de Meuron, still retaining their uniforms would participate in the Pemmican War.

References
Works cited
 WO25/679 Regimental description and succession book and Regiment book 1801-1815, held by The National Archives (United_Kingdom) , Kew
Sources
Biography of Louis de Watteville at the Dictionary of Canadian Biography Online
 
 
Citations

Infantry regiments of the British Army
Mercenary units and formations
British military units and formations of the War of 1812
Expatriate military units and formations
Military units and formations disestablished in 1816
Pemmican War